Eleni Daniilidou and Jasmin Wöhr were the last champions of the event in 2010, but decided not to participate. 
Misaki Doi and Elina Svitolina won the title, defeating Oksana Kalashnikova and Paula Kania in the final, 6–4, 6–0.

Seeds

Draw

Draw

References
 Main Draw

Istanbul Cup - Doubles
İstanbul Cup